Plean railway station served the village of Plean, Stirlingshire, Scotland from 1904 to 1956 on the Scottish Central Railway.

History 
The station opened on 1 March 1904 by the Scottish Central Railway. To the south were sidings which served nearby collieries and to the north was the signal box. The station closed to both passengers and goods traffic on 11 June 1956.

References

External links 

Disused railway stations in Stirling (council area)
Former Caledonian Railway stations
Railway stations in Great Britain opened in 1904
Railway stations in Great Britain closed in 1956
1904 establishments in Scotland
1956 disestablishments in Scotland